Massimo Biella (28 February 1926 – 4 December 2012) was the Catholic bishop of the Diocese of Biella, Italy.

Ordained to the priesthood in 1950, he was named bishop in 1972 and retired in 2001.

Notes

1926 births
2012 deaths
Bishops of Biella